The second season of Kuroko's Basketball anime series is produced by Production I.G. It is based on the manga series of the same name written and illustrated by Tadatoshi Fujimaki. The second season premiered on October 6, 2013 and ended on March 29, 2014, also with 25 episodes. The DVD and Blu-ray version of the second season was released on June 20, 2014, along with an episode which was designed around a specific chapter in the manga by Tadatoshi Fujimaki by working on chapter 124, and a bonus CD with an audio drama starring Satsuki Momoi.

For the second season, GRANRODEO sang both opening themes: the first one is "The Other self", and the second is "Ever-changing Magical Star" (変幻自在のマジカルスター Hengen Jizai no Majikarusutā). Its ending theme is "WALK" by the band OLDCODEX, which also sang the second ending theme of the first season. The second ending to the second season is "FANTASTIC TUNE" by Kenshō Ono, the voice actor for the series' main protagonist, Tetsuya Kuroko.

On October 19 2020, the SAG-AFTRA listed and approved an English dub for the series under the "Netflix Dubbing Agreement". The English-dubbed second season debuted on Netflix on May 15, 2021.


Episode list

References

Kuroko's Basketball episode lists
2013 Japanese television seasons
2014 Japanese television seasons